WCMN (1280 AM, "Noti Uno Norte") is a radio station broadcasting a news radio format. Licensed to Arecibo, Puerto Rico.  The station is currently owned by Caribbean Broadcasting Corporation. The station is shared with translator station W221ER 92.1 FM also located in Arecibo.

Translator stations

References

External links

 

CMN
Radio stations established in 1947
CMN (AM)
1947 establishments in Puerto Rico
IHeartMedia radio stations